Joseph Brant Arseneau (born September 3, 1967)  is an entrepreneur and executive, best known for his work in both fintech and space technology. He is generally known in finance for his work in Electronic Trading,  Renewable Energy Derivatives, and Capital Markets technology. He has been both a chief information officer (CIO) for large banks and an entrepreneur, having started several fintech start-ups. Arseneau has moved into the NewSpace industry and is currently a founding partner at 9Point8 Capital and a founder of Spaced Ventures.

Early life and education
Arseneau was born in Canada and began his education at the University of New Brunswick where he became interested in neural networks in 1986. He completed his electrical engineering degree with a senior project entitled, VLSI and Neural Systems. His interest in computational intelligence continued at the University of Aberdeen where he researched the application of neural networks to software reengineering. This research went on to form the foundation to a patent being awarded to Raymond Obin and Brian Reynolds for a commercial reengineering process. Arseneau expanded his research into other areas of biologically-inspired systems (computational intelligence), which included; neural networks, genetic algorithms, fuzzy logic, swarm intelligence, and intelligent agents. His earlier research on computational intelligence and reengineering (software) is frequently cited.

Career

Early Years
He was an early adopter of internet technologies and leveraging his earlier academic work in Software Engineering, he built one of the first Internet-based (HTML) project management tools while at JPMorgan in 1996. The tool was sold to a silicon valley start-up called Netmosphere that eventfully was bought by public company Critical Path in June 2000.

Finance Technology
His primary area of business expertise is in financial technology (FinTech), in particular capital markets including; high performance computing for trading, new securitization methods, derivatives, and financing techniques in developing economies. His work on high-frequency trading has been leveraged by several academic research efforts and more recently a commercial venture.

His work on renewable energy was first based on microfinance methods and it continues to gain popularity as both financial and technical infrastructure matures. His team was also involved in the development of the Renewable Energy Derivative, which is a structured product that securitizes renewable energy into property-based debt obligations backed by the cash flows of excess energy. Thus providing a responsible use of the environment to finance properties in third world countries. The method was initially intended to finance lower income housing in developing countries by replacing the credit risk with the operational risk of the renewable energy assets' capability to generate predictable cash flows. The financing is structured so that the risk is to be underwrite until the cost of the houses can be claimed by the banks. The new method includes operational risk transfer and mitigation through insurance, weather derivatives and "world class" preventive maintenance programs.

Space and DeepTech

Arseneau is establishing himself as a Space industry finance expert  and has founded 9Point8 Capital and co-founded Spaced Ventures. 9Point8 Capital is a strategic advisory firm that helps new space companies with growth and scalability. Spaced Ventures will be this first regulated platform that will provide public access to private space investments while providing early stage capital to space start-up companies.  Spaced Ventures also provides industry data and analytics to the public and potential investors including a tool called SpacedBase.

References

External links
 

1967 births
Living people
Canadian inventors
21st-century American engineers
21st-century American inventors